Muskegon, a city in the US. state of  Michigan, is the county seat of Muskegon County. Situated around a harbor of Lake Michigan, Muskegon is known for fishing, sailing regattas, and pleasure boating, and as a commercial- and cruise-ship port. It is a popular vacation destination because of the expansive freshwater beaches, historic architecture, and public art collection. It is the most populous city along Michigan's western shore. At the 2020 United States Census, the city's population was 38,318. The southwest corner of Muskegon Township, the city is administratively autonomous.

Muskegon is the center of the Muskegon metropolitan statistical area, which is coextensive with Muskegon County and had a population of 173,566 in 2019. It is also part of the larger Grand Rapids-Kentwood-Muskegon-combined statistical area with a population of 1,433,288.

History

Early inhabitants 

Human occupation of the Muskegon area goes back 7 to 8,000 years to the nomadic Paleo-Indian hunters who occupied the area following the retreat of the Wisconsonian glaciations. The paleo-Indians were superseded by several stages of Woodland Indian developments, the most notable were of the Hopewellian-type tradition, who occupied this area perhaps 2,000 years ago.

The Muskegon area was previously inhabited by various bands of the Odawa (Ottawa) and Pottawatomi Indian tribes, but by 1830, the area was solely an Ottawa village. Perhaps the best-remembered of the area's native inhabitants was the Ottawa chief, Pendalouan. A leading participant in the French-inspired annihilation of the Fox Indians of Illinois in the 1730s, Pendalouan and his people lived in the Muskegon vicinity during the 1730s and '40s, until the French forced them to move their settlement to the Traverse Bay area in 1742.

The name "Muskegon" is derived from the Ottawa tribe term mashkiigong, meaning "marshy river or swamp".

European arrival 
The "Masquigon" River (Muskegon River) was identified on French maps dating from the late 17th century, suggesting French explorers had reached Michigan's western coast by that time. Father Jacques Marquette traveled northward through the area on his fateful trip to St. Ignace in 1675, and a party of French soldiers under La Salle's lieutenant, Henry de Tonty, passed through the area in 1679.

The county's earliest known Euro-American resident was Edward Fitzgerald, a fur trader and trapper who came to the Muskegon area in 1748 and who died there, reportedly being buried in the vicinity of White Lake. Between 1790 and 1800, a French-Canadian trader named Joseph La Framboise established a fur-trading post at the mouth of Duck Lake. Between 1810 and 1820, several French-Canadian fur traders, including Lamar Andie, Jean Baptiste Recollect, and Pierre Constant, had established fur-trading posts around Muskegon Lake.

Euro-American settlement of Muskegon began in earnest in 1837, which coincided with the beginning of the exploitation of the area's extensive timber resources. The commencement of the lumber industry in 1837 inaugurated what some regard as the most romantic era in the history of the region. Lumbering in the mid-19th century brought many settlers, particularly from Germany, Ireland, and Canada.

Some Muskegon neighborhoods began as separate villages. Bluffton was founded as a lumbering village in 1862 in Laketon Township. It had its own post office from 1868 until 1892. Muskegon annexed it in 1889.

Geography
The city is next to Lake Michigan to the west and Muskegon Lake to the north. The Muskegon River empties into Muskegon Lake at the city's northeast end.

Climate
Muskegon has a humid continental climate (Dfa) with hot summers and cold winters. Precipitation is consistent year-round. Muskegon receives heavy lake-effect snow from Lake Michigan during winter.

Demographics

2010 census
As of the census of 2010,  38,401 people, 13,967 households, and 7,895 families resided in the city. The racial makeup of the city was 57.0% White, 34.5% African American, 0.9% Native American, 0.4% Asian, 2.6% from other races, and 4.5% from two or more races. Hispanics or Latinos of any race were 8.2% of the population.

Of the 13,967 households, 32.5% had children under 18 living with them, 27.9% were married couples living together, 22.9% had a female householder with no husband present, 5.8% had a male householder with no wife present, and 43.5% were not families. About 36.0% of all households were made up of individuals, and 12.8% had someone living alone who was 65 or older. The average household size was 2.38. and the average family size was 3.09.

The median age in the city was 34.1 years; the age distribution was 23.3% were under 18; 12.2% from 18 and 24; 28.8% from 25 to 44; 24.1% from 45 to 64, and 11.6% were 65 or older. The city's gender makeup was 52.1% male and 47.9% female.

2000 census
As of the census of 2000, 40,105 people, 14,569 households, and 8,537 families were residing in the city. The racial makeup of the city was 57.9% White, 31.7% African American, 2.3% Native American, 0.46% Asian]],  2.7% from other races, and 3.50% from two or more races. Hispanic or Latino people of any origins were 6.4% of the population.

Of the 14,569 households, 31.1% had children under 18 living with them, 33.2% were married couples living together, 20.2% had a female householder with no husband present, and 41.4% were not families. About 34.4% of all households were made up of individuals, and 12.9% had someone living alone who was 65 or older. The average household size was 2.42, and the average family size was 3.13.

In the city, the age distribution was 25.8% under 18, 11.6% from 18 to 24, 32.2% from 25 to 44, 18.0% from 45 to 64, and 12.4% who were 65 age or older. The median age was 32 years. For every 100 females, there were 109.6 males. For every 100 females 18 and over, there were 110.3 males.

The city's median income for a household was $27,929, and for a family was $32,640. Males had a median income of $29,114 versus $22,197 for females. The per capita income for the city was $14,283. About 16.8% of families and 20.5% of the population were below the poverty line, including 27.6% of those under age 18 and 14.3% of those 65 or over.

Economy

Downtown Muskegon
Downtown Muskegon serves as the hub for much of Muskegon County. Positioned along the southern shoreline of Muskegon Lake, it stretches for nearly two miles. Downtown is home to a number of hotels, a 25,000-square-foot convention center completed in 2021, and the Historic Mercy Health Ice Arena. Downtown Muskegon is lauded for its walkability and ease of parking.  The Muskegon Farmer's Market welcomes more than 10,000 visitors every Saturday in the summer, and the boutique incubator shops and chalets on Western Avenue are a popular attraction for residents and tourists looking to support  local small businesses.

In May 2022, local environmental groups announced cleanup efforts along Muskegon Lake officially have been completed, leading the Environmental Protection Agency to begin its study to remove Muskegon Lake from the EPA's list of "Areas of Concern", which was expected to be finalized by the end of 2022 and promised additional new economic activity in the downtown and nearby lakefront neighborhoods.

Major employers
 ADAC Automotive – automotive components manufacturing
 Howmet (Whitehall, Michigan, formerly Alcoa) – aerospace components manufacturing
 Anderson Global (formerly Anderson Pattern)
 Brunswick Bowling Products, LLC
 Cannon-Muskegon Corporation – specialty alloys
 Century Foundry
 Cole's Quality Foods – garlic bread, frozen foods
 Consumers Energy
 Eagle Group
 Fleet Engineers
 GE Aviation (formerly Johnson Technology) – turbine engine components manufacturing
 Great Lakes Die Cast (formerly Dilesco)
 Kaydon Corp – precision bearings
 Knoll Inc. (formerly Shaw Walker)
 L3 Communications (formerly Teledyne) – armored vehicle manufacturing
 Mahle (formerly Dana, formerly Sealed Power) – piston rings, aerospace
 Meijer
 Mercy Health – member of Trinity Health
 Michigan's Adventure – amusement park (Michigan's largest amusement park and water park)
 Nugent Sand
 Port City Group
 Pratt & Whitney Component Solutions – a Raytheon Technologies Company
 SAF-Holland – Muskegon (formerly Neway Equipment Company) – commercial vehicle axles, suspensions, and coupling devices
 Wesco, Inc. (headquarters)

Arts and culture

Music and fine arts
The Frauenthal Center for the Performing Arts includes two theaters (the main historic Frauenthal house and the smaller Beardsley Theater in the adjoining Hilt Building). It was refurbished in 1998 and again in 2021, and runs JAM Theatrical productions. Muskegon Civic Theatre productions, is home of the West Michigan Symphony Orchestra, was the venue for all Muskegon Community Concert Association events, and formerly home to the now-defunct Cherry County Playhouse. The Frauenthal was originally built as the Michigan Theater in 1929.

Muskegon has a well-respected private collection of fine art at the Muskegon Museum of Art.

Muskegon has a growing collection of publicly owned and displayed art pieces. More than two dozen pieces are on permanent display, predominately in the downtown area. Notable pieces include Muskegon, Together Rising (Richard Hunt), The Arch (Stephen Urry), A City Built on Timbers (Erik and Israel Nordic), and various Civil War statues in Hackley Park that date back to 1900 (Charles Niehaus and J. Massey Rhind) .

Festivals

For many years, Muskegon was home to a 10-day music festival known as Muskegon Summer Celebration.  Typically scheduled around July 4, Summer Celebration was known for bringing in major artists for several days, and providing the community with an affordable music-festival experience. The event ended after the 2011 show.

Events held in the town include:

Taste of Muskegon in June
Parties in the Park, every Friday from June to August at Hackley Park
The Lakeshore Art Festival in June
WeDiscover Festival in July, a two-day festival of electronic dance music, import and luxury cars, food,  fireworks and family activities.
Motorcycle rally in July
Burning Foot Beer Festival held at Pere Marquette Beach
The Unity Christian Music Festival in August at Heritage Landing
The Michigan Irish Music Festival in September at Heritage Landing
The Muskegon Polish Festival on Labor Day weekend.
The International Buster Keaton Society annual convention in October.

Museums and theater

Broadway at the Frauenthal (fall through spring) brings Broadway musicals to Muskegon. Muskegon is also home to Muskegon Museum of Art and West Michigan Symphony Orchestra. The Muskegon Community Concert Association provides concerts from September through May.

Lakeshore Museum Center (formerly known as Muskegon County Museum) and Hackley & Hume Historic Site: Mansions built by Muskegon's lumber barons themselves are restored to their old glory and open to the public. The Hackley & Hume mansions are part of downtown Muskegon's Heritage Village—two blocks from Muskegon Lake, and a National Register Historic District. The mansions are operated with the Lakeshore Museum Center, which details the grand, rich history of Muskegon County, from the Pottawatomi and Ottawa Native American tribes and lakeside fur traders to the Lumber Queen of the World to today. Also includes science and nature exhibits.

The Muskegon Museum of Art (formerly known as the Hackley Art Gallery) opened in 1912. The Muskegon Museum of Art, founded on a tradition of aesthetic excellence, is committed to fostering the life-long study and appreciation of the visual arts by strengthening, preserving, and exhibiting its collections; offering a wide range of traditional and contemporary exhibitions; stimulating learning and creativity through diverse public and educational programming; and enhancing community involvement and support in a safe, accessible, and welcoming environment.  Among the highlights of its permanent collection is Tornado Over Kansas, by John Steuart Curry (one of three leading painters, along with Grant Wood and Thomas Hart Benton, identified as Regionalists and known for their canvases celebrating the rural Midwest).

In addition, Muskegon also berths , a former passenger ship built in 1904 that traveled the same route as Lake Express does today. The ship (which is a National Historic Landmark) is in the middle of a process of being restored to its original form, but in the meantime is open for tours and hosts a museum aboard the vessel with information on both Milwaukee Clipper, as well as the history of maritime in Muskegon, the Clipper is the last ship of its type. Muskegon is a historical port for commerce and lake travel. The lumbering era through World War II was its busiest historical use. Its image as a port the city has embraced with the local nickname 'The Port City'. It possesses a fine deep-water port and still functions delivering bulk cement, aggregate, and large cargoes to several lakeshore facilities, also coal to the B.C. Cobb power plant, an outdated coal-burning facility due to shut down.

 The Muskegon Heritage Museum-The Muskegon Heritage Association is a non-profit corporation founded in 1973 to promote the enhancement of Muskegon's Historic Resources. One of the MHA's missions is to maintain a museum to show the economic, industrial, and social history of the greater Muskegon area. The Museum was begun by the MHA in 1983 to accommodate the donated Corliss Valve 90 hp steam engine. The museum's goal is to preserve information, photos, and artifacts pertaining to The Industries of the Muskegon Area, Historic/Heritage Homes, and Businesses of Muskegon. In 2009 a revitalization of the museum began with a complete rearrangement of the main room adding new displays in the cases and on the walls. A print shop was set up and an Industrial section in the back building was rearranged. Printed signs for all displays were added. In 2010 the museum was expanded into what was the shoe store next door. During 2011-2012 we reconfigured and remodeled the second floor of the building where the Corliss Engine is housed. This is a "Made in Muskegon" exhibit. The museum also added a classroom that accommodates 35 people comfortably with all the AV equipment necessary for any presentation.
 Carr-Fles Planetarium, Muskegon
 The Muskegon Area Sports Hall of Fame exhibits, detailing the area's rich athletic past, are on display at the L.C. Walker Arena.

Sports

Previous sports teams to play in Muskegon have included:

The Seaway Run is run every year in late June. It features a 15k race, 5k race, 5k walk for fun, 15k wheelchair race.

Parks and recreation

Muskegon State Park has a Winter Sports Complex that features ice fishing, cross-country skiing, ice skating, and a luge track.

P.J. Hoffmaster State Park has many sand dunes as well as two campgrounds and a public beach.

Pere Marquette Beach is the largest free public beach on the western shore of Lake Michigan. Windsurfing, kite boarding competitions, and professional volleyball tournaments are held there. Its quartz sand beach is a Clean Beaches Counsel-certified beach. The beach area is popular with cyclists, runners, and hikers, and sand dunes border the beach to the east.

Muskegon Lake is a first-class walleye fishery and has many other freshwater species, including lake perch. Lake Michigan hosts large numbers of coho and Chinook salmon, steelhead, brown trout, lake perch, and other game fish.

Sailing and recreational boating are major summer pastimes, with local services and marinas for boats of all sizes.

Muskegon Lakeshore Bike Trail allows for biking along the shores of Muskegon Lake to Lake Michigan, with two trails for bike paths, one on the east side of Muskegon and the other along the north side, which northerly connects to other trails, such as the Hart-Montague Bike Trail, making it possible to bike from Muskegon to Hart, Michigan, without ever leaving a bike trail.

Michigan's Adventure, the largest amusement park in the state, is in Muskegon County, a few miles north of the city of Muskegon. Michigan's Adventure features a midway with roller coasters, other rides, amusements, and a full water park.

Muskegon Country Club was founded in 1908 and features a course design by Tom Bendelow and a course redesign by Donald Ross.

Government
The city operates under a Commission-Manager form of local government. The seven-member city commission consists of four commissioners elected via a ward system and two commissioners elected at large. The mayor is also elected at large and serves on the city commission. The city commission hires a city manager to manage the daily operations of the city.

Education
Muskegon Public Schools was founded in 1860 and serves students from preschool through grade 12. Additionally, it runs the Muskegon Training and Education Center. Muskegon is also served by these private K-12 schools: Muskegon Catholic Central, Fruitport Calvary Christian, and Western Michigan Christian.

In 2010, North Muskegon High School was noted as the top performing public school in the State of Michigan by the state Department of Education.

The City of Muskegon is also served by Muskegon Community College and Baker College.

Grand Valley State University's Muskegon Campus is home to the Muskegon Innovation Hub (formerly MAREC) and Annis Water Resources Institute (AWRI) inside the Lake Michigan Center in downtown Muskegon.

Western Michigan University, Ferris State University, and Grand Valley State University all operate programs out of the Stevenson Center for Higher Education on Muskegon Community College campus. It is designed so an undergraduate at MCC may transfer to any of the above schools and complete a bachelors and/or master's degree without leaving Muskegon.

Media
Muskegon's leading newspaper is The Muskegon Chronicle. The Chronicle is a daily newspaper owned by Booth Newspapers. It started publication in 1857.
Muskegon is served by several local television channels:
WMKG-CD 38 is a low-powered television station serving the area. This station features a homey mix of programming such as television bingo and Dial-A-Bargain. The Dial-A-Bargain show includes a host reading menus from various local eateries. Viewers may then call in and purchase certificates for that establishment at 50% off the regular price.
DSETV-97 is the locally run Government-access television (GATV) cable TV channel based out of City Hall, privately ran by Digital Spectrum Enterprises on Comcast Cable Channel 97. It features live televised City Hall meetings as well as locally made television shows showcasing Muskegon, and is home to local sports events.
MCCTV-98 is Muskegon Community College's television outlet on Comcast Cable Channel 98.
 WWMT-TV 3 (CBS and CW), WOOD-TV 8 (NBC), WZZM-TV 13 (ABC), WXMI-TV 17 (FOX), WOMS-TV 29 (MNTV), WGVU-TV 35 (PBS), WOTV (ABC), WZPX (ION), and WTLJ-TV 54 (TBN). Green Bay, Milwaukee, South Bend, and Chicago affiliates are also common in the warmer months.
Comcast holds the local cable franchise.
The Muskegon area is also served by several radio stations. WUVS-LP 103.7 is a popular urban (hip-hop/R&B) and gospel station with local programming as well as Sunday religious programming and local-based talk. Another local low-powered FM station is WUGM-LP 106.1, owned by the Muskegon Training and Education Center, which airs an Urban Oldies format dubbed "M-TEC 106 FM, Rock 'n' Soul." A Newer LP-FM Station WFFR-LP 100.9 also offers local programming along with a classic hits format. The station is based out of nearby Roosevelt Park.
Local radio talk shows include the Ramona Show on WKBZ 1090. On this show the host interviews local small business people. A once-a-week, Friday afternoon show on the same station is called "Talking Muskegon". Hosted by local celebrity Jon Van Wyke, it features homey conversations about area nightlife, his work life and volunteer activities, and the state of the professional hockey team, the Muskegon Fury. It is usually co-hosted.
Other local FM stations include 90.3 WBLV-FM (classical/jazz/NPR), 91.7 WMCQ-FM (religious), WWSN FM 92.5 (adult contemporary), WGVS-FM 95.3 (public radio), WLAW-FM FM 97.5 (country), WLCS-FM 98.3 (oldies), WVIB-FM 100.1 (urban contemporary), WMRR-FM 101.7 (classic rock), WSNX-FM 104.5 (top 40, studios in Grand Rapids), WOOD-FM-FM 106.9 (news/talk, simulcast of WOOD-AM 1300/Grand Rapids), and WMUS FM 107.9 (country). Other local AM stations aside from WKBZ include WGVS 850, WLAW 1490 (country). Other area stations can be received from Grand Haven (WGHN-FM 92.1, adult contemporary), Grand Rapids (WGRD-FM 97.9, mainstream rock), Ludington, Holland, Zeeland (WJQK-FM 99.3, Christian pop), and Milwaukee.
iHeartMedia is the major radio station owner in Muskegon, owning WKBZ-AM, WOOD-FM, WMUS-FM, WMRR-FM and, WSNX (although WSNX is considered primarily a Grand Rapids station despite being licensed to Muskegon). Cumulus Media owns WODJ-AM, WLAW-FM, WEFG-FM, WLCS-FM and WVIB-FM.

Infrastructure

Transportation 

Public transportation is provided by the Muskegon Area Transit System (MATS – "The Shore Line"), which operates nine bus routes, three trolley routes, and a paratransit system. MATS and Greyhound serve the Herman Ivory Passenger Terminal.

MATS operates the Muskegon Trolley Company. Three routes cover north side, south side, and downtown; each trolley stops at 11 locations, including Hackley and Hume Historic Site, USS Silversides, and Muskegon State Park. (Memorial Day through Labor Day, daily; no trips during special events.)

Commercial air service is currently provided by United Express operating regional jet flights on behalf of United Airlines at Muskegon County Airport (MKG), with nonstop service to Chicago O'Hare Airport. Other airlines provide passenger service via the Gerald R. Ford International Airport (GRR) in Grand Rapids.

Muskegon is the eastern port of the Lake Express High Speed Car Ferry that crosses Lake Michigan to Milwaukee, Wisconsin offering three roundtrips a day in the summer, and two roundtrips in the fall. There are many bike paths being built around the area.

CSX Transportation, along with the Michigan Shore Railway, provide rail service for many of Muskegon's industries. Rail passenger services ended in the 1960s. The nearest passenger rail available is via Amtrak in nearby Holland or Grand Rapids.

Several major highways serve the city, including:

Major roads 

Interstates

U.S. Highways

, a business loop

Other state highways

Rail
Until 1971, the Chesapeake & Ohio Railway (successor to the Pere Marquette Railway) operated day and night trains from Union Station to Holland and Chicago. The Grand Trunk Western and the Pennsylvania Railroad had earlier operated passenger trains out of another Muskegon station to various points in Michigan.

Ferries
In 1937, the Grand Trunk Western began operating ferries that met up with train and carried passengers and automobiles across Lake Michigan to Milwaukee. Earlier, the GTW had operated the ferries out of Grand Haven. The GTW stopped operating the ferries in 1978. The last remaining ferries across the lake would be the ones launching from Ludington, Michigan until the Lake Express first came into service on June 1, 2004.

Notable people 

 John Beyrle, son of Joseph Beyrle, U.S. Ambassador to the Russian Federation confirmed July 3, 2008.
 Joseph Beyrle, only soldier to have served in both the US Army and the Soviet Army in World War II 
 Nancy Anne Fleming, Miss America 1961
 Seth Privacky, mass murderer
 Vonda Kay Van Dyke, Miss America 1965
 Captain Jonathan Walker, "The Man With Branded Hand" abolitionist

Business and politics
 Margaret Bailey Chandler, community leader and member of the Little River Band of Ottawa Indians
 Tudor Dixon, politician
 Charles Hackley (1837–1905), lumber baron, philanthropist (Hackley Hospital, Hackley Library, Hackley Administration Building, Hackley Avenue, Hackley Art Gallery, Hackley Park); after a gift of $12 million to the community, the city of Muskegon considered changing its name to "Hackleyville"

 George Edward Hilt, founder of the largest U.S. farm-store retailer
 Richard Mell, politician

Religion
 Jim Bakker, TV evangelist
 Edmund Cardinal Szoka, cardinal, President Emeritus of the Pontifical Commission for Vatican City State

Science and technology
 Clara H. Hasse (1880–1926), botanist
 David Leestma, astronaut
 W. Wesley Peterson, mathematician and computer scientist, invented the Cyclic Redundancy Check (CRC)

Artists
 Haddon Sundblom, graphic artist, created popular images of Santa Claus for Coca-Cola

Authors
 Laurie Keller, children's book writer and illustrator best known for The Scrambled States of America and Grandpa Gazillion's Number Yard
 Douglas Malloch, the “lumberman’s poet”
 John Frederick Nims, poet
 Cathy O'Brien, conspiracy theorist and author 
 Lewis B. Smedes, theologian and author
 Bob Wood, author of Dodger Dogs to Fenway Franks and Big Ten Country

Music
 Børns, singer and songwriter, born in Muskegon
 Steve Gorman, drummer, Black Crowes, born in Muskegon
 Rick Johnson, musician, bass player for Mustard Plug
 Bettye LaVette, soul singer
 Iggy Pop, punk rock icon
Louise Cooper Spindle, composer

 Wayne Static, lead singer and guitarist for industrial metal band, Static-X
 Bill Szymczyk, music producer of the Eagles, The Who and others
 Gerry Teifer, music publisher, songwriter, performer
 Richard Versalle, opera singer

Stage
 Buster Keaton, iconic comedian and film director; born in Kansas and spent childhood summers in Muskegon with his family in the Muskegon Actors' Colony; a vaudevillian who traveled constantly except in summer, Keaton regarded Muskegon as his home town.
 Kate Reinders, Broadway actress, played Glinda in Wicked and Caroline in Good Vibrations
 Carly Jibson, Broadway and television actress, played Tracy Turnblad in the first national tour company of Hairspray and originated the role of Pepper in the musical Cry Baby.

Television
Matt Crouch, film producer and CEO of TBN
 Harry Morgan, versatile stage, film and TV actor, played Colonel Potter on the TV series M*A*S*H (1972–1983)
 Frank Stanton, former president of CBS

Sports
 Justin Abdelkader – NHL player, Detroit Red Wings
 Curtis Adams – NFL player, San Diego Chargers
 Beatrice Allard – All-American Girls Professional Baseball League player
 Virginia Bell – served in the Women's Army Corps in Japan during World War II and later joined the All-American Girls Professional Baseball League
 Donna Cook – AAGPBL player
 Doris Cook – AAGPBL player
 Deyonta Davis – NBA player, Memphis Grizzlies
 Miss Dougal – AAGPBL player, 1953 Muskegon Belles
 Tony Ferguson – winner of Ultimate Fighter Season 13
 Bill Green – hammer thrower, former U.S. record holder, 5th place in 1984 Olympic Games
 Bobby Grich – MLB All-Star second baseman for the Baltimore Orioles and California Angels
 Mark Grimmette – men's double luge, winner of Olympic silver (2002) and bronze (1998) medals
 Mark Hughes – basketball player and coach
 Ronald Johnson – University of Southern California and San Francisco 49ers wide receiver
 Alta Little – AAGPBL player
 Ruvell Martin – NFL player for the Seattle Seahawks
 Nate McCrary, NFL running back for the Baltimore Ravens
 Beulah McGillicutty – manager in Extreme Championship Wrestling
 Nate McLouth – MLB player for the Washington Nationals
 Earl Morrall – Michigan State and NFL quarterback, three-time Super Bowl champion
 Robert Morse – NFL player for the New Orleans Saints
 Drew Naymick – professional basketball player
 Don Nelson – NBA player for Boston Celtics and coach in Basketball Hall of Fame, University of Iowa basketball player
 Ray Newman – MLB pitcher
 Bennie Oosterbaan – three-time University of Michigan All-American football player and head coach
 Marley Shriver - Olympic swimmer
 Terrance Taylor – Detroit Lions defensive tackle
 Kalil Pimpleton - New York Giants wide receiver

Sister cities 
 Ōmuta, Fukuoka Prefecture, Japan
 Hartlepool, County Durham, United Kingdom
 Antalya, Turkey

See also 

Michigan Heritage Park

References

External links 

 
 Muskegon Area Chamber of Commerce
 

 
Cities in Muskegon County, Michigan
County seats in Michigan
Michigan populated places on Lake Michigan
Michigan Neighborhood Enterprise Zone
Populated places established in 1837
1837 establishments in Michigan